Wisut Ponnimit (August 15, 1976, Bangkok), sometimes known by the nickname Tum or Tam, is a Thai cartoonist, animator, illustrator and musician. He is best known for creating the cartoon character Mamuang who  has attained significant popularity in Thailand and Japan as well as hesheit, an ongoing series of short comic stories. Started in 1998, hesheit is one of the first alternative Thai comics and one of the only Thai comic series partly translated into English and Japanese. During a two-year study trip in Japan from 2003 to 2005, Wisut Ponnimit started working as a manga artist for Japanese publishing companies such as Shinchosha and Shogakukan. His manga series Blanco was published in the Japanese magazine Ikki Comics (Shogakukan) between 2007 and 2010. He has also contributed regularly to the alternative Thai comics anthologies MUD published by Typhoon Books from 2008 to 2011. In 2013, an English book of Ponnimit's translated as Him Her That gained critical acclaim, and Time Out Tokyo called it "the English manga book you simply have to buy." Aside from his comics career, Wisut Ponnimit also creates short animation movies and their soundtracks, sometimes for television commercials. He is also the drummer of the band named Penguin Villa.

Profile 
Wisut Ponnimit began drawing since he was in grade 7. As a child, he was influenced by manga such Dragon Ball by Akira Toriyama and Captain Tsubasa by Yōichi Takahashi and later by manga artist such as Takehiko Inoue, Mitsuru Adachi, Osamu Tezuka and Rumiko Takahashi. He also mentions the animated cartoons Mickey Mouse, Pink Panther and Doraemon as being important encounters influencing the foundation of his art with little dialogue. While in college in 1998, he sent some of his comic stories to the newly founded alternative manga magazine BeboydCg which started publishing his comics series hesheit. He obtained a degree in interior design from the Faculty of Decorative Arts, Silpakorn University. After graduating, he kept working as a cartoonist in Thailand but, due to a lack of inspiration, he decided to go to Japan. He left Thailand in 2004 and headed to Japan where he studied Japanese language and lived in a new environment to find ideas and writing inspiration. Earning a place in the 2005 Yokohama Triennale, he caught the attention of Japanese manga publishers and signed contracts with Shinchosha and Shogakukan. Most of his works have been first published in Japan then translated in Thai for the Thai market. His manga Everybodyeverything, serialized in the Japanese Magazine 5 in 2005, was the  first comic book of a Thai cartoonist published initially in Japan (in Magazine 5) and introduced the famous character Mamuang whose marchandise is substantial. He has also been named by Elle magazine Japan as one of the worlds’ 250 most interesting people to watch and was awarded the Encouragement Prize/New Face Award, Manga Division, at the 13th Japan Media Arts Festival in 2009 for his manga hesheit aqua. His manga series Blanco was published in the Japanese magazine Ikki Comics (Shogakukan) between 2007 and 2010. He has also contributed regularly to the alternative Thai comics anthology MUD published by Typhoon Books from 2008 to 2011. A collection of hesheit short stories were translated into English by Awai Books under the title Him Her That. Wisut Ponnimit currently shares his life between Thailand and Japan.

Style 
Wisut Ponnimit's comic book series hesheit, incorporating untidy, childlike drawing styles and unstructured, little or no dialogue, is considered as exemplary of the alternative style of Thai cartooning. His genre-dynamiting manga blur the borders between art and literature while offering humor, warmth and philosophical accessibility. His writing style originated from his own perception about the world and himself. His comic stories depict how he sees things in his life and around. “It is like telling a story about someone, it could be my mom or my friend” said Wisut Ponnimit.

Mamuang 
Mamuang is a famous character who made her first appearance in the comic book "Everybodyeverything". The little girl is named Mamuang, which means mango in Thai, in relation of her hair whose shape evokes the form of the stone fruit. The character became well known in Thailand through a series of Line application stickers. Millions of people downloaded a Mamuang sticker because of its cuteness.

Work 
hesheit, 1998-ongoing, 12 volumes, serialized in Katch and a day Thai magazines, first published by BeboydCg then Typhoon Books and now a book
Smoke Under the Hat, 2003, published by day after day Co. Ltd. then by Typhoon Books. Japanese edition in 2007. 
Everybodyeverything, 2005, first comic book of a Thai cartoonist published initially in Japan (in Magazine 5) and published afterwards in Thai (by Typhoon Books in 2005). Introducing the famous character Mamuang
Tam-khun and Japan, 2006, published in Japan by Shinchosha and afterwards in Thailand by Typhoon Books  
Blanco, 6 volumes, 2008-2010, serialized in the Japanese magazine Ikki Comics, published in Japan by Shongakukan and afterwards in threes volumes in Thailand by a book (2011-2012)  
hesheit aqua (2009, Nanarokusha, translation into Japanese of stories previously published in Thailand. Awarded the Encouragement Prize, Manga Division, 13th Japan Media Arts Festival in 2009.
Romance, 2010, first published in Japan by Ohta Publishing and afterwards in Thailand by Typhoon Books (2011) 
hesheit orange (2012, Nanarokusha, translation into Japanese of stories previously published in Thailand
Mamuang chan, 2012, published in Thailand by a book
Him Her That, 2013, English book translation of hesheit stories, translated by Matthew Chozick, published by Awai Books
Advertising animation(TVC) for Yamaha
Icon animation for mobile company "Docomo"
Paper man (Animation cartoon for Double A company)
Drummer of "Penguin Villa" (Album called "Go out side)

References 

Living people
Thai comics artists
Thai cartoonists
1976 births